Halogen Communications is an independent communications consultancy based in Edinburgh, Scotland, with an international office in Washington, D.C. The agency was founded on 1 July 2002 and specialises in public affairs, public relations and crisis management.

The agency is owned by John Crawford, a former Chief of Staff of The Scottish Conservative Party and advertising executive, and Raymond Robertson, the former MP for Aberdeen South and Scottish Conservative Party Chairman.

Halogen Communications works with clients in both the public and private sectors.

References

External links
 

Companies based in Edinburgh
Public relations companies of the United Kingdom